Lucius Cornelius P.f. P.n. Scipio (fl. 174 BC), Roman praetor in 174 BC, was the younger son of Scipio Africanus, the great Roman general and statesman by his wife Aemilia. He was the son and grandson of Roman consuls, but his own personal life and political career was vitiated by his dissolute habits and possibly by his continued ill-health.

Early life
Nothing is known about Lucius's early life, except that he was born during the Second Punic War.  If his parents married circa 212 BC (possibly earlier or later), and if he had an elder brother, he was probably born around 210 BC or 209 BC when his father was already in Spain.  In that case, he would have spent his entire childhood seeing little of his father who was winning Rome territories in Spain and then defeating Hannibal at Zama.

Lucius is most notable for probably being the unnamed son who was captured by pirates circa 192 BC. This son was released without ransom by Antiochus III of Syria before the Battle of Magnesia (190 BC).  The fact that Scipio paid no ransom for his son's release would cause him political problems with the Senate two years later.

It is possible that Lucius learned in Syria the dissolute habits and lifestyle which marked the rest of his life.

Later life
In 174 BC, he was elected praetor with the help of his father's former scribe, Gaius Cicereius, now a considerably wealthy freedman.  However, in the same year, he was expelled by the Senate, in a low point for the Scipiones.

His date of death is unknown, but he probably died between 174 BC and 170 BC. It is possible that his death, which left his brother with no male heirs, forced the brother Publius to adopt his own first cousin as his heir.  This adoptive son would be Scipio Aemilianus.

References

3rd-century BC births
170s BC deaths
Lucius Cornelius P.f. P.n. Scipio
Cornelius, Lucius Cornelius P.f. P.n. Scipio
3rd-century BC Romans
2nd-century BC Romans